Pilsner Urquell is a lager beer brewed by the Pilsner Urquell Brewery in Plzeň (German name: Pilsen), Czech Republic. Pilsner Urquell was the world's first pale lager, and its popularity meant it was much copied, and named pils, pilsner or pilsener. It is hopped with Saaz hops, a noble hop variety which is a key element in its flavour profile, as is the use of soft water. It is available in 330 ml, 355 ml and 500 ml aluminium cans and green or brown bottles.

Almost all draught Pilsner Urquell is sold filtered, but small quantities are available in limited amounts unfiltered. The majority of the beer is sold in the Czech Republic, Slovakia, Germany and South Korea, it is also sold in China, Japan, the United Kingdom, the United States, Sweden, Hungary and Austria. In recent years, the unpasteurized "tank" version of the beer has become increasingly available.

History 
Pilsner Urquell was the first pale lager, and the name pilsner is often used by its copies. It is characterised by its golden colour and clarity, and was immensely successful: nine out of ten beers produced and consumed in the world are pale lagers based on Pilsner Urquell. The German name, which means 'original source', was adopted as a trademark in 1898.

By 1839 most beer in Bohemia was dark and top fermented. However bottom-fermented lagers were gaining popularity. The people of Plzeň preferred imported cheaper bottom-fermented beers to local top fermented ales. The burghers of Plzeň invested in a new, state-of-the art brewery, the Měšťanský pivovar (Burghers' Brewery), and hired Josef Groll, a Bavarian brewer, to brew a bottom-fermented beer. On 5 October 1842, Groll had a new mash ready and on 11 November 1842, the new beer was first served at the feast of St. Martin markets.

The brewery registered Pilsner Bier B. B. name in 1859. In 1898, they also registered names Original Pilsner Bier 1842, Plzeňský pramen, Prapramen, Měšťanské Plzeňské, Plzeňský pravý zdroj and finally Pilsner Urquell and Plzeňský Prazdroj, which are in use today.

Pilsner Urquell is today brewed solely in the Pilsen brewery. It was brewed between 2002 and 2011 in Tychy, Poland and between 2004 and 2017 in Kaluga, Russia.

See also 
 Beer in the Czech Republic
 List of oldest companies

References

External links 

 Official website Pilsner Urquell
 Official website Plzeňský Prazdroj
 Beer production chart: an interactive scheme of the Pilsner Urquell production
 Your Next Beer – Pilsner Urquell: a podcast about this beer, touches on taste and history

Beer in the Czech Republic
Beer brands of the Czech Republic
Plzeň
Purveyors to the Imperial and Royal Court
Asahi Breweries
Food and drink companies established in 1842